The discography of John Williamson, an Australian singer-songwriter, consists of twenty studio albums, twenty-five compilation album, eight live album, three EPs. Williamson has sold over 4 million records in Australia.

Albums

Studio albums

Live albums

Notes

Soundtrack albums

Compilation albums

Box sets

Chronological list of all albums

 John Williamson (1970)
 Travlin' Out West in Concert (1973)
 From Travlin' Out West (1974)
 Comic Strip Cowboy (1976)
 Road to Town (1978)
 Radio Special (1978)
 Country Greats (1978)
 Fair Dinkum J.W. (1982)
 True Blue – The Best of John Williamson (1982)
 Singing in the Suburbs (1983)
 The Smell of Gum Leaves (1984)
 Humble Beginnings (1985)
 Road Thru the Heart (1985)
 All the Best! (1986)
 Mallee Boy (1986)
 Boomerang Café (1988)
 Warragul (1989)
 JW's Family Album (1990) 
 Waratah St (1991) 
 Australia Calling – All the Best Vol 2 (1992)
 Love Is a Good Woman (1993)
 Mulga to Mangoes (1994) 
 True Blue – The Very Best of John Williamson (1995)
 Family Album No.2 (1996)
 Pipe Dream (1997)
 Country Classics (1997)
 The Spirit of Australia (1998)
 Wandering Australia (1998)
 John Williamson for Aussie Kids (1998)
 Boogie with M'Baby (1998)
 The Glory of Australia (1999)
 Laugh Along with John Williamson (1999)
 The Way It Is (1999)
 Australia (1999)
 Anthems – A Celebration of Australia (August 2000)
 Gunyah (2002) 
 True Blue Two (2003)
 Mates on the Road (2004)
 From Bulldust to Bitumen: 20 Queensland Songs (2005)
 Chandelier of Stars (2005)
 We Love this Country (2005)
 Country Classics 2 (2006)
 The Platinum Collection (2006)
 Wildlife Warriors (2006)
 Hillbilly Road (2008)
 Absolute Greatest: 40 Years True Blue (2010)
 John Williamson in Symphony (2011)
 The Big Red (2012)
 Hell of a Career (2013)
 Honest People (2014) 
 His Favourite Collection (2016)
 Butcherbird (2018)
 JW Winding Back 1970-2020 (2020)
 JW Bangers (2022)

Extended plays

Singles

Video albums

Music videos

References

Country music discographies
Discographies of Australian artists